Kim Leine Rasmussen (28 August 1961 in Seljord, Telemark) is a Danish-Norwegian author who writes about Greenland.

In 2013, he was awarded the Nordic Council Literature Prize for the novel The Prophets of Eternal Fjord.

Bibliography

Novels 
 Kalak (2007)
 Valdemarsdag (2008)
 Tunu (2009)
 Profeterne i Evighedsfjorden (2012); English translation: The Prophets of Eternal Fjord part 1 of the Greenlandic trilogy
 Afgrunden (2015)
 De søvnløse (2016)
 Rød mand/Sort mand (Gyldendal, 2018); English translation: The Colony of Good Hope (March 2022) part 2 of the Greenlandic trilogy
 Efter Åndemaneren (Gyldendal, 2021) part 3 of the Greenlandic trilogy

Children's books 
 Drengen der drog nordpå med sin far for at finde julemanden (2015), illustrated by Peter Bay Alexandersen
 Skovpigen Skærv (2016), illustrated by Peter Bay Alexandersen
 Pigen der kunne tale med hunde (2017), illustrated by Peter Bay Alexandersen

Comics 
 Trojka 1: Skarabæens time (2018), illustrated by Søren Mosdal

References

Norwegian emigrants to Denmark
Danish male novelists
People from Telemark
People from Seljord
Nordic Council Literature Prize winners
1961 births
Living people
21st-century Norwegian novelists
21st-century Danish novelists
Norwegian male novelists
21st-century Danish male writers